Murid gammaherpesvirus 4 (MuHV-4) is a species of virus in the genus Rhadinovirus. It is a member of the subfamily Gammaherpesvirinae in the family Herpesviridae. This species infects mice via the nasal passages and causes an acute infectious mononucleosis-like syndrome with elevated levels of leukocytes, and shifts in the relative proportion of lymphocytes along with the appearance of atypical mononuclear cells.  Murid gammaherpesvirus 4 currently serves as a model for study of human gammaherpesvirus pathogenesis.

Strains 
Seven strains of Murid gammaherpesvirus 4 have been isolated, including the following six:

 MuHV-Šum
 MuHV-60
 MuHV-68
 MuHV-72
 MuHV-76
 MuHV-4556

References 

Gammaherpesvirinae
Animal viral diseases
Rodent diseases